Final Descent may refer to:

 Final Descent (album), a 1990 album by Samhain
 Final Descent (film), a 1997 television film
 The Final Descent, a horror novel by Rick Yancey